Jablanik  (Serbian Cyrillic: Јабланик) is a mountain in western Serbia, near the town of Valjevo. Its highest peak Jablanik has an elevation of 1,275 meters above sea level.

Jablanik is located at the source of the river Jablanica. It is separated from nearby Medvednik mountain by the high Stolica pass, while the Debelo Brdo saddle separates it from Povlen in the southeast. The highest peak has the same name as the mountain itself - Jablanik, and is 1,275 m high. The hills around the peak are mainly forested but the peak itself is barren, so if visibility is good the view from above is breathtaking. Grid square of the mountain is JN94TE.

References

Mountains of Serbia